Nitin Madhukar Nandgaonkar is an Indian politician with the Shiv Sena party in Maharashtra. 

Nandgaonkar was earlier member of the Maharashtra Navnirman Sena, and held position of the General Secretary of Vahatuk Sena. He started his political career with the Shiv Sena. .

References

External links 
 Nitin Nandgaonkar
 Nitin Nandgaonkar (@officialnitinnandgaonkar) • Instagram photos and videos
 
 Shiv Sena leader Nitin Nandgaonkar threatens senior doctor over release of COVID-19 victim’s body
 Sena leader Nitin Nandgaonkar creates ruckus at Hiranandani Hospital over release of COVID-19 victim's body
 Nitin Nandgaonkar: घरात घुसून मारू; शिवसैनिक नितीन नांदगावकर यांना धमक्या
 Nitin Nandgaonkar- saviour of women - Mumbai Messenger | Mumbai Messenger
 WATCH | Shiv Sena's Firebrand Leader Abuses, Threatens Sr Doctor Of Mumbai's Hiranandani Hospital Over Release Of Dead Body Of Covid Victim
 "अस्मिता महत्वाची की लाचारी?" नितीन नांदगावकरांना संदीप देशपांडेंचा टोला
 ‘Serial molester’ caught on CCTV gets thrashed by Sena leader on video

1969 births
Living people
Shiv Sena politicians
Marathi politicians
Politicians from Mumbai